Giuseppe Pisano (born 26 April 1988) is an Italian–German footballer who plays as a forward for Rot-Weiß Oberhausen.

References

External links

1988 births
Living people
German footballers
German people of Italian descent
FC Schalke 04 II players
Borussia Mönchengladbach II players
Rot-Weiß Oberhausen players
1. FC Saarbrücken players
3. Liga players
Regionalliga players
Association football forwards
Footballers from Düsseldorf